Allan Joseph Kayser II (born December 18, 1963) is an American film and TV actor.

Biography
Kayser was born and raised in Littleton, Colorado, and attended Columbine High School from 1978 to 1982. Shortly after graduating, Kayser moved to Los Angeles, California, and began his acting career. He was a part of several motion pictures in the 1980s, including Hot Chili and Night of the Creeps. However, Kayser is perhaps best known for starring in 95 episodes of the American television sitcom Mama's Family from 1986 to 1990, making him a teen idol in the 1980s.  In 1989, Kayser was nominated for a Young Artist Award as Best Young Actor Guest Starring in a Drama or Comedy Series for his part as Bubba Higgins in Mama's Family.

Kayser was previously married to Lori Kayser; with whom he had 2 children. As of August 23, 2014, he is married to Sara Kayser. The couple also had 2 children.

Honors
Kayser was inducted into the Missouri Walk of Fame at the annual Missouri Cherry Blossom Festival, located in Marshfield, Missouri, in 2022.

Filmography

Film
 Hot Chili (Jason) – 1985
 Night of the Creeps (Brad) – 1986
 Journey of the Heart (Glen) – 1997
 Double Teamed (Nicky's Dad) – 2002
 More Than Puppy Love (Tony) – 2002
 Shimmer (Eric McKenzie) – 2006
 All Roads Lead Home (Tobias) – 2008
 Next Caller (Handsome Billy Bob Brown) – 2009
 House of Forbidden Secrets (Brad) – 2013
 House of the Witch Doctor (Cliff Rifton) – 2013

Television
 Mama's Family (Mitchel "Bubba" Higgins) (95 episodes, 1986–90)

Guest appearances
 The $25,000 Pyramid (5 appearances, 1987)
 The New Hollywood Squares (2 appearances, 1987 and 1989)
 Circus of the Stars #14 (1989)
 Vicki! (Vicki Lawrence's talk show, 1992)

References

External links 
 
 Allan Kayser on TV Tome
 Young Artist Awards: 1989

1963 births
Living people
People from Littleton, Colorado
American male film actors
American male television actors
Male actors from Colorado
Columbine High School alumni